Larissa Adler Lomnitz (June 17, 1932 - April 13, 2019) was a French-born Chilean-Mexican social anthropologist, researcher, professor, and academic. After living in France, Colombia, and Israel, she received Chilean nationality by marriage and Mexican nationality by residence. She conducted research and studies regarding the way in which marginalized classes survive in Latin America. She pioneered the study of social networks and the study of the importance of trust for the economy and politics. Her first study in this regard focused on the exchange of favors in the Chilean middle class. Lomnitz completed her doctoral thesis about the importance of exchanging favors and confidence in the informal economy in Mexico City. She then explored the importance of social networks in very diverse fields: scientific communities, the Mexican upper class, and the teaching profession in Chile, among others. She wrote more than 70 chapters in books, nine books, and various popular articles for magazines.

Early life and education
Larissa Adler Milstein was born in Paris, France, 1932, to Jewish-Romanian parents. Her father was the anthropologist, Miguel Adler, who trained with Paul Rivet. Her mother was Noemi Lisa Milstein de Adler (1910-1976). 

Shortly after Lomnitz was born, her family moved to live in Colombia. In 1948, when the State of Israel was formed, her family joined the Kibbutz movement. In 1950, she married the Chilean geophysicist, Cinna Lomnitz, with whom she lived in Chile and the United States. Their children were Jorge (1954-1993), Claudio, Alberto, and Tania.

Lomnitz received a bachelor's degree with Honors in Social Anthropology at the University of California, Berkeley. In 1974, she earned a doctorate in the same specialty at the Universidad Iberoamericana (UIA) of Mexico City.

Career
In 1967, Lomnitz affiliated with the Center for Mental Health Research at the University of Chile. In Mexico, she affiliated with the Children's Hospital of the Secretariat of Health, as well as the Center for Technological Innovation and the Institute of Applied Mathematics Research of National Autonomous University of Mexico. Lomnitz taught ethnology and economic anthropology at Universidad Iberoamericana; Urban sociology and Exchange Systems at the Faculty of Architecture of the National Autonomous University of Mexico; and Urban Methodology and Anthropology at the National School of Anthropology and History). She was a visiting professor at Columbia University, the Graduate School of Arts and Science of the New York University, the University of Wisconsin–Madison, the University of Notre Dame, the Hebrew University of Jerusalem, the Fundación José Ortega y Gasset, the University of Chicago, and the University of Paris among others.

She specialized in research and study on how people live and help marginalized classes in Latin America. As with Oscar Lewis, Lomnitz rejected the relationship between human migration, urbanization, and disorganization proposed by the Chicago environmentalists based on the theories of Richard Adams. She conducted studies of the Mexican university world indicating that there were four “life careers”: academic, professional, ideological politics, and pragmatic politics. In the area of political anthropology, she demonstrated that highly centralized systems generate a parallel system of informal economy, as happened in the former Soviet Union.

Lomnitz was a member of several societies and academies, including the Mexican Society of Anthropology, the Mexican Academy of Sciences, the Society of Urban Anthropology and Economics, The College of Ethnologists and Anthropologists, and the Javier Barros Sierra Foundation. She served as president of the Society for Latin American Anthropology, and was the director of the War and Peace Studies Commission of the International Union of Anthropological and Ethnological Sciences. She was a member of the Scientific Committee of the UNESCO Forum on Higher Education Research and Knowledge. She was an emeritus researcher for the National System of Researchers and a member of the Science Advisory Council of the Presidency of the Republic. In 2010, she was elected a member of the American Academy of Arts and Sciences.

Guillermo de la Peña Topete published Lomnitz's biography, Larissa Adler Lomnitz: Antropóloga latinoamericana, in 2004. She died in Mexico City, Mexico, April 13, 2019.

Awards and honors
 Guggenheim Fellowship, 1977
 Premio Universidad Nacional, in the area of social sciences, Universidad Nacional Autónoma de México (UNAM), 1990
 Investigadora Emérita, Sistema Nacional de Investigadores, 1996
 Honorary doctorate, University of Massachusetts, 1998
 Alfonso Reyes Chair, University of Paris, 2000
 Chair of Mexican Studies, University of Notre Dame, 2001.
 Emeritus Researcher, Institute of Applied Mathematics and Systems Research, UNAM, 2005
 National Prize for Arts and Sciences, 2006
 Member, American Academy of Arts and Sciences, 2010

Selected works
 Reciprocity of Favors in the Middle Class of Chile, 1971
 Networks and marginality (Cerrada del Cóndor, engl.) Life in a Mexican shantytown., 1977
 ¿Cómo sobreviven los marginados? 
 A Mexican Elite Family 1820-1980 : Kinship, Class and Culture, 1987
 Chile's middle class : a struggle for survival in the face of neoliberalism, 1991
 Redes sociales cultura y poder : ensayos de antropologia latinoamericana, 1994
 Chile's political culture and parties : an anthropological explanation 2000
 Simbolismo y ritual en la política mexicana
 Lo formal y lo informal en las sociedades contemporáneas, 2008
 "Migration" in Networks and Marginality, 1977
 “Supervivencia en una barriada de la ciudad de México” in Demografía y Economía
 "Problemática de la ciencia en México" in Ciencia
 “Anthropology and Development in Latin America” in Human Organization

References

1932 births
2019 deaths
20th-century Chilean women writers
20th-century Mexican women writers
20th-century Mexican writers
21st-century Chilean women writers
21st-century Mexican women writers
Academic staff of the University of Chile
Chilean anthropologists
Mexican anthropologists
Chilean women anthropologists
Mexican women anthropologists
Women educators
Chilean non-fiction writers
Mexican non-fiction writers
French people of Romanian-Jewish descent
University of California, Berkeley alumni
Universidad Iberoamericana alumni
Academic staff of the National Autonomous University of Mexico
New York University faculty
Fellows of the American Academy of Arts and Sciences
National Prize for Arts and Sciences (Mexico)